is a  mountain, located on the border of Higashiyoshino and Kawakami, Nara, Japan.

Outline 
Mount Azami is one of the Daikō Mountains. Its two peaks are known as Oyama (男山) and Meyama (女山), respectively meaning male peak and female peak. It is one of the Kinki 100 mountains.

Route 

The most popular route is from Ōmata Bus Stop of Nara Kōtsu. It takes two and half hours via Mount Ōkagami.

Access 
Ōmata Bus Stop of Nara Kōtsu

Gallery

References
Ōdaigahara, Takami, Kurosoyama, Shobunsha, 2008
Official Home Page of the Geographical Survey Institute in Japan

Mountains of Nara Prefecture